Oligodon lungshenensis is a species of snake of the family Colubridae. It is endemic to China.

Geographic range
The snake is known from a number of locations in central and southern China, from Chongqing, Guangxi, Guizhou, and Hunan provinces.

References

lungshenensis
Reptiles described in 1978
Snakes of China
Endemic fauna of China